Phytoseius is a genus of mites in the Phytoseiidae family.

Species

 Phytoseius acaciae Walter & Beard, 1997
 Phytoseius aleuritius Wu, 1981
 Phytoseius amba Pritchard & Baker, 1962
 Phytoseius antigamenti El-Banhawy & Abou-Awad, 1989
 Phytoseius averrhoae De Leon, 1965
 Phytoseius balcanicus Wainstein, 1969
 Phytoseius bambusae Swirski & Shechter, 1961
 Phytoseius bandipurensis Gupta, 1980
 Phytoseius bennetti De Leon, 1965
 Phytoseius betsiboka Blommers, 1976
 Phytoseius betulae Denmark, 1966
 Phytoseius blakistoni Ehara, 1966
 Phytoseius borealis Chant, 1965
 Phytoseius brevicrinis Swirski & Shechter, 1961
 Phytoseius brigalow Walter & Beard, 1997
 Phytoseius bulgariensis Wainstein, 1969
 Phytoseius bunya Walter & Beard, 1997
 Phytoseius californicus Kennett, 1967
 Phytoseius camelot Walter & Beard, 1997
 Phytoseius campestris Ehara, 1967
 Phytoseius canadensis Chant, 1965
 Phytoseius capitatus Ehara, 1966
 Phytoseius carpineus Wainstein, 1978
 Phytoseius chanti Denmark, 1966
 Phytoseius chinensis Wu & Li, 1982
 Phytoseius ciliatus Wainstein, 1975
 Phytoseius cismontanus De Leon, 1965
 Phytoseius coheni Swirski & Shechter, 1961
 Phytoseius comodera El-Banhawy & Abou-Awad, 1989
 Phytoseius corniger Wainstein, 1959
 Phytoseius corylus Wu, Lan & Zhang, 1992
 Phytoseius cotini Wang & Xu, 1985
 Phytoseius crenatus Ryu, 1993
 Phytoseius crinitus Swirski & Shechter, 1961
 Phytoseius curoatus Chaudhri
 Phytoseius curtisetus Moraes & Mesa, in Moraes, Mesa & Braun 1991
 Phytoseius curvatus Chaudhri, 1973
 Phytoseius dandongensis Lu & Yin, 1992
 Phytoseius danutae Walter & Beard, 1997
 Phytoseius darwin Walter & Beard, 1997
 Phytoseius decoratus Gonzalez & Schuster, 1962
 Phytoseius deleoni Denmark, 1966
 Phytoseius delicatus Chant, 1965
 Phytoseius devildevil Walter & Beard, 1997
 Phytoseius diutius Corpuz-Raros, 1966
 Phytoseius domesticus Rather, 1985
 Phytoseius douglasensis Schicha, 1984
 Phytoseius duplus Ueckermann & Loots, 1985
 Phytoseius echinus Wainstein & Arutunjan, 1970
 Phytoseius ferax Afzal, Akbar & Qayyum, 2000
 Phytoseius ferox Pritchard & Baker, 1962
 Phytoseius flagrum Shahid, Siddiqui & Chaudhri, 1982
 Phytoseius fotheringhamiae Denmark & Schicha, 1975
 Phytoseius fujianensis Wu, 1981
 Phytoseius glareosus Corpuz-Raros, 1966
 Phytoseius guianensis De Leon, 1965
 Phytoseius hawaiiensis Prasad, 1968
 Phytoseius hera Wainstein & Beglyarov, 1972
 Phytoseius hongkongensis Swirski & Shechter, 1961
 Phytoseius hornus Shahid, Siddiqui & Chaudhri, 1982
 Phytoseius horridus Ribaga, 1904
 Phytoseius huaxiensis Xin, Liang & Ke, 1982
 Phytoseius huqiuensis Wu, 1980
 Phytoseius hydrophyllis Poe, 1970
 Phytoseius ikeharai Ehara, 1967
 Phytoseius improcerus Corpuz-Raros, 1966
 Phytoseius incisus Wu & Li, 1984
 Phytoseius indicus Bhattacharyya, 1968
 Phytoseius intermedius Evans & MacFarlane, 1962
 Phytoseius jujuba Gupta, 1977
 Phytoseius juvenis Wainstein & Arutunjan, 1970
 Phytoseius kapuri Gupta, 1969
 Phytoseius kazusanus Ehara, in Ehara, Okada & Kato 1994
 Phytoseius kisumuensis Moraes & McMurtry, in Moraes, McMurtry, van den Berg & Yaninek 1989
 Phytoseius kishii Ehara, 1967
 Phytoseius koreanus Ryu & Ehara, 1991
 Phytoseius latinus El-Banhawy, 1984
 Phytoseius leaki Schicha, 1977
 Phytoseius leonmexicanus (Hirschmann, 1962)
 Phytoseius litchfieldensis Walter & Beard, 1997
 Phytoseius livschitzi Wainstein & Beglyarov, 1972
 Phytoseius longchuanensis Wu, 1997
 Phytoseius longus Wu & Li, 1985
 Phytoseius lyma Shahid, Siddiqui & Chaudhri, 1982
 Phytoseius macropilis (Banks, 1909)
 Phytoseius macrosetosus Gupta, 1977
 Phytoseius maldahaensis Gupta, 1992
 Phytoseius maltshenkovae Wainstein, 1973
 Phytoseius mancus Afzal, Akbar & Qayyum, 2000
 Phytoseius mansehraensis Chaudhri, 1973
 Phytoseius mantecanus De Leon, 1965
 Phytoseius mantoni Walter & Beard, 1997
 Phytoseius marumbus El-Banhawy, 1984
 Phytoseius mayottae Schicha, 1984
 Phytoseius meyerae Gupta, 1977
 Phytoseius mindanensis Schicha & Corpuz-Raros, 1992
 Phytoseius minutus Narayanan, Kaur & Ghai, 1960
 Phytoseius mixtus Chaudhri, 1973
 Phytoseius moderatus Wainstein & Beglyarov, 1972
 Phytoseius montanus De Leon, 1965
 Phytoseius mumafloridanus (Hirschmann, 1962)
 Phytoseius mumai Ehara, 1966
 Phytoseius nahuatlensis De Leon, 1959
 Phytoseius namdaphaensis Gupta, 1986
 Phytoseius neoamba Ueckermann & Loots, 1985
 Phytoseius neocorniger Gupta, 1977
 Phytoseius neoferox Ehara & Bhandhufalck, 1977
 Phytoseius neohongkongensis Moraes & McMurtry, in Moraes, McMurtry, van den Berg & Yaninek 1989
 Phytoseius neomontanus Moraes & McMurtry, in Moraes, McMurtry, van den Berg & Yaninek 1989
 Phytoseius nipponicus Ehara, 1962
 Phytoseius nudus Wu & Li, 1984
 Phytoseius olbios Afzal, Akbar & Qayyum, 2000
 Phytoseius onilahy Blommers, 1976
 Phytoseius oreillyi Walter & Beard, 1997
 Phytoseius orizaba De Leon, 1965
 Phytoseius paludis De Leon, 1965
 Phytoseius paluma Walter & Beard, 1997
 Phytoseius panormita Ragusa & Swirski, 1982
 Phytoseius perforatus El-Badry, 1968
 Phytoseius pernambucanus Moraes & McMurtry, 1983
 Phytoseius pesidiumii Nassar & Kandeel, 1983
 Phytoseius petentis Chaudhri, Akbar & Rasool, 1979
 Phytoseius phenax Afzal, Akbar & Qayyum, 2000
 Phytoseius plumifer (Canestrini & Fanzago, 1876)
 Phytoseius punjabensis Gupta, 1977
 Phytoseius purseglovei De Leon, 1965
 Phytoseius qianshanensis Liang & Ke, 1981
 Phytoseius quercicola Ehara, in Ehara, Okada & Kato 1994
 Phytoseius rachelae Swirski & Shechter, 1961
 Phytoseius rasilis Corpuz-Raros, 1966
 Phytoseius rex De Leon, 1966
 Phytoseius rhabdifer De Leon, 1965
 Phytoseius ribagai Athias-Henriot, in Chant & Athias-Henriot 1960
 Phytoseius rimandoi Corpuz-Raros, 1966
 Phytoseius roseus Gupta, 1969
 Phytoseius rubiginosae Schicha, 1984
 Phytoseius rubii Xin, Liang & Ke, 1982
 Phytoseius rubiphilus Wainstein & Vartapetov, 1972
 Phytoseius rugatus Tseng, 1976
 Phytoseius rugosus Denmark, 1966
 Phytoseius ruidus Wu & Li, 1984
 Phytoseius salicis Wainstein & Arutunjan, 1970
 Phytoseius scabiosus Xin, Liang & Ke, 1983
 Phytoseius scrobis Denmark, 1966
 Phytoseius seungtaii Ryu & Ehara, 1993
 Phytoseius severus Wainstein & Vartapetov, 1972
 Phytoseius shuteri Schicha, 1987
 Phytoseius solanus El-Badry, 1968
 Phytoseius songshanensis Wang & Xu, 1985
 Phytoseius sonunensis Ryu & Ehara, 1993
 Phytoseius spathulatus Chaudhri, 1973
 Phytoseius spoofi (Oudemans, 1915)
 Phytoseius stammeri (Hirschmann, 1962)
 Phytoseius stephaniae Schicha, 1984
 Phytoseius subtilis Wu & Li, 1984
 Phytoseius swirskii Gupta, 1980
 Phytoseius taiyushani Swirski & Shechter, 1961
 Phytoseius tenuiformis Ehara, 1978
 Phytoseius tropicalis Daneshvar, 1987
 Phytoseius turiacus Wainstein & Kolodochka, 1976
 Phytoseius vaginatus Wu, 1983
 Phytoseius venator Khan, Chaudhri & Khan, 1990
 Phytoseius viaticus De Leon, 1967
 Phytoseius wainsteini Gupta, 1981
 Phytoseius wangii Wu & Ou, 1998
 Phytoseius woodburyi De Leon, 1965
 Phytoseius woolwichensis Schicha, 1977
 Phytoseius yuhangensis Yin, Yu, Shi & Yang, 1996
 Phytoseius yunnanensis Lou, Yin & Tong, 1992

References

Phytoseiidae